Mailson is a given name. It may refer to:

 Maílson da Nóbrega (born 1942), Brazilian economist
 Maílson Alves (born 1988), Brazilian football defender
 Mailson (footballer, born 1990), Mailson Francisco de Farías, Brazilian football winger
 Mailson Lima (born 1994), Cape Verdean football winger
 Mailson (footballer, born 1996), Mailson Tenório dos Santos, Brazilian football goalkeeper